Yuri Alexandrovich Skvortsov (20 February 1929 in Moscow – 1998) was a Soviet ski jumper who competed in the late 1950s. He won the 1955-6 Four Hills Tournament event at Bischofshofen.

He is buried at Kuntsevo Cemetery in Moscow.

References

1929 births
1998 deaths
Russian male ski jumpers
Soviet male ski jumpers
Skiers from Moscow
Burials at Kuntsevo Cemetery